M.D.(Doctor of Medicine in Ayurveda) or Ayurveda Vachaspati is the three-year master's course in the Indian medical system of Ayurveda. MD/MS (Ayurveda) is offered in many medical colleges in India and Sri Lanka.  The selection to the MD/MS (Ayurveda) course is generally done by a competitive National level written entrance examination which is called AIAPGET - All India AYUSH Post Graduate Entrance Test, which is open to candidates with BAMS.  

The Post-Graduate Course is of 3 Years duration. Some of the post-graduate courses are: 

 MD Agad Tantra	(Medical Jurisprudence & Toxicology)
 MD Bala Roga	(Pediatrics)
 MD Dravya Guna	(Materia Medica & Pharmacology)
 MD Kayachikitsa	(Internal Medicine)
 MD Maulika Siddhanta	(Fundamental Principles)
 MD Panchakarma	(Penta Bio-Purification Methods)
 MD Roga & Vikriti Vijnana	(Clinical Medicine & Pathology)
 MD Rasa Shastra & Bhaishajya Kalpana	Iatro-Chemistry (Rasa Chikitsa)
 MD Sharira Rachana (Anatomy)
 MD Sharira Kriya	(Physiology)
 MD Swasthya Vritta	(Preventive & Social Medicine)
 MD Rasayana & Vajikarana (Geriatrics and Aphrodisiacs)
 MS Prasuti Stri Roga	(Gynaecology & Obstetrics)
 MS Shalya Tantra	(Surgery)
 MS Shalakya Tantra (ENT & Ophthalmology)

References

Ayurveda
Academic degrees of India
Medical degrees
Medical education in India